Massimo Sammartino (born 8 September 1995) is an Italian footballer who currently plays as a defender for Gibraltar National League side Boca Gibraltar.

Club statistics

Club

Notes

References

1995 births
Living people
Italian footballers
Italian expatriate footballers
Association football defenders
Serie C players
Maltese Premier League players
A.S. Roma players
U.S. Pistoiese 1921 players
Mosta F.C. players
Bangor City F.C. players
F.C. Boca Gibraltar players
Expatriate footballers in Malta
Italian expatriate sportspeople in Malta
Expatriate footballers in Wales